Wurfbainia uliginosa is the type species of the recently reconstituted plant genus Wurfbainia in the ginger family.  Its native range is from Indo-China to Sumatra.

References

External links
 

uliginosa
Flora of Indo-China 
Flora of Malesia